Potjevleesch is a traditional French Flemish dish, which can be translated into English as "potted meat".

It is traditionally made in a ceramic dish from three or four different types of meat and held together with natural gelatin coming from the meats used. The meat, along with sliced onions, salt, pepper, thyme and bay leaves, is covered in water or a mixture of water and vinegar and then cooked either on a low heat in the oven or on a low flame on top of the stove for 3 hours. After cooking, the dish is chilled then placed in the refrigerator and served cold.

It is customary to serve it with chips on top of it for melting down the gelatin.

See also
Food preservation

References

French cuisine
Lille
Meat dishes